Siamak Koohnavard (born 21 July 1984) is an Iranian Football player who currently plays for Bargh Jadid Shiraz FC of the Azadegan League.

Club career
Koohnavard has played his entire career for Moghavemat Sepasi.

Club career statistics

 Assist Goals

References

External links
Siamak Koohnavard at Soccerway

1984 births
Living people
Iranian footballers
Fajr Sepasi players
Naft Tehran F.C. players
Sanat Naft Abadan F.C. players
Rah Ahan players
Gostaresh Foulad F.C. players
Persian Gulf Pro League players
Association football midfielders